Curvinomia formosa is a species of bee in the genus Curvinomia, of the family Halictidae.

References

Halictidae
Hymenoptera of Asia
Insects of Sri Lanka
Insects described in 1858